Judges 12 is the twelfth chapter of the Book of Judges in the Old Testament or the Hebrew Bible. According to Jewish tradition the book was attributed to the prophet Samuel, but modern scholars view it as part of the Deuteronomistic History, which spans in the books of Deuteronomy to 2 Kings, attributed to nationalistic and devotedly Yahwistic writers during the time of the reformer Judean king Josiah in 7th century BCE. This chapter records the activities of judges Jephthah, Ibzan, Elon, and Abdon. belonging to a section comprising Judges 6:1 to 16:31.

Text
This chapter was originally written in the Hebrew language. It is divided into 15 verses.

Textual witnesses
Some early manuscripts containing the text of this chapter in Hebrew are of the Masoretic Text tradition, which includes the Codex Cairensis (895), Aleppo Codex (10th century), and Codex Leningradensis (1008). 

Extant ancient manuscripts of a translation into Koine Greek known as the Septuagint (originally was made in the last few centuries BCE) include Codex Vaticanus (B; B; 4th century) and Codex Alexandrinus (A; A; 5th century).

Analysis
A linguistic study by Chisholm reveals that the central part in the Book of Judges (Judges 3:7–16:31) can be divided into two panels based on the six refrains that state that the Israelites did evil in Yahweh’s eyes:

Panel One
 A 3:7 
 B 3:12 
And the children of Israel did evil again in the sight of the 
B 4:1 
And the children of Israel did evil again in the sight of the 

Panel Two
A 6:1 
And the children of Israel did evil in the sight of the  
B 10:6 
And the children of Israel did evil again in the sight of the 
B 13:1 
And the children of Israel did evil again in the sight of the 

Furthermore from the linguistic evidence, the verbs used to describe the Lord’s response to Israel’s sin have chiastic patterns and can be grouped to fit the division above:

Panel One
3:8 , “and he sold them,” from the root , 
3:12 , “and he strengthened,” from the root , 
4:2 , “and he sold them,” from the root , 

Panel Two
6:1 , “and he gave them,” from the root , 
10:7 , “and he sold them,” from the root , 
13:1 , “and he gave them,” from the root , 

This chapter contains the Jephthah's Narrative, which can be divided into 5 episodes, each with a distinct dialogue, as follows:

Jephthah and the Ephraimites (12:1–7)
This section contains the fifth (the final) episode in the Jephthah Narrative. As with Gideon in Judges 8:1–3, the Ephraimites complained that they had not been asked to join in the battle (so they could also enjoy the spoils), but this time it ended in a civil war, which the Gileadites, unified by Jephthah, had upperhand. The Gileadites used the pronunciation of the Hebrew word "Shibboleth" to distinguish the Ephraimites, so they could kill them.

Ibzan (12:8–10)
Jephthah was succeeded by Ibzan as the judge of Israel for seven years. He had thirty sons and thirty daughters, and when he died, he was buried in his native town, "Bethlehem", which is not followed by "Ephratah" or by "Judah" so it could be the Bethlehem in the territory of Zebulun (Joshua 19:15).

Elon (12:11–12)
Ibzan was succeeded by the tenth judge, Elon, who was given very few statistics and with no historical exploits, other than he was from the tribe of Zebulun, succeeded Ibzan to judge Israel for ten years. When he died, he was buried in Aijalon in the territory of Zebulun.

Abdon (12:13–15)
Elon was succeeded by Abdon, the son of Hillel, a Pirathonite, of the tribe of Ephraim, who had forty sons and thirty grandsons, and judged Israel for eight years, restoring order in the central area of Israel in the aftermath of the civil war involving Jephthah and the Gileadites.

See also

Related Bible parts: Judges 10, Judges 11

Notes

References

Sources

External links
 Jewish translations:
 Shoftim - Judges - Chapter 12 (Judaica Press). Hebrew text and English translation [with Rashi's commentary] at Chabad.org
 Christian translations:
 Online Bible at GospelHall.org (ESV, KJV, Darby, American Standard Version, Bible in Basic English)
 Judges chapter 12. Bible Gateway

12